Massachusetts's 13th congressional district is an obsolete district. It was also for a short time in the early 19th century a Massachusetts District of Maine. It was eliminated in 1963 after the 1960 U.S. Census. Its last location was in eastern Massachusetts.

List of members representing the district

References

 

13
Former congressional districts of the United States
1963 disestablishments in Massachusetts
Constituencies established in 1795
Constituencies disestablished in 1963
1795 establishments in Massachusetts